Mientje Kling (born Wilhelmina Francisca Kling; 27 July 1894 – 26 February 1966) was a Dutch theatre and film actress and radio personality.

Mientje Kling was born in Amsterdam. Kling made her stage at the Koninklijke Vereeniging Het Nederlandsch Tooneel theatre and performed from 1913 in silent films for Filmfabriek Hollandia film studios. In the 1920s and 1930s, she worked alongside many popular actors in several plays for the Central Tooneel theatre. After her marriage to actor Constant van Kerckhoven, she performed mainly in radio dramas. She died at the age of 71 in Amsterdam.

Selected filmography
Nederland en Oranje (1913)
Krates (1913)
Liefde waakt (1914)
Zijn viool (1914)
De bloemen, die de ziel vertroosten (1914)
Heilig recht (1914)
The Devil in Amsterdam (1919)
Amsterdam bij nacht (1924)
De Speeldoos (1926)

References

External links

Mientje Kling at een leven lang theater

1894 births
1966 deaths
Dutch stage actresses
Dutch film actresses
Dutch silent film actresses
Actresses from Amsterdam
20th-century Dutch actresses